Harpalus martini is a species of ground beetle in the subfamily Harpalinae. It was described by Vandyke in 1926.

References

martini
Beetles described in 1926